Piloto Civil Norberto Fernández International Airport is located  west of Río Gallegos, a city in the Santa Cruz Province of Argentina.

The airport was constructed in 1964, and the paved runway was inaugurated in 1972 with a Caravelle flight of Aerolíneas Argentinas.

Río Gallegos' airport has the longest runway in the country.

The Rio Gallegos VOR-DME (Ident: GAL) and non-directional beacon (Ident: G) are located on the field.

Airlines and destinations

See also

Transport in Argentina
List of airports in Argentina

References

External links

RGL at Aeropuertos Argentina 2000 (official web site)

Airports in Argentina